Mark Oliver Saville, Baron Saville of Newdigate,  (born 20 March 1936) is a British judge and former Justice of the Supreme Court of the United Kingdom.

Early life
Saville was born on 20 March 1936 to Kenneth Vivian Saville and Olivia Sarah Frances Gray, and educated at Rye Grammar School. He undertook National Service in the Royal Sussex Regiment between 1954 and 1956 at the rank of second lieutenant. He studied at Brasenose College, Oxford, graduating with first class honours in law (Bachelor of Arts) and a Bachelor of Civil Law degree, and where he won the Vinerian Scholarship. He was called to the bar by the Middle Temple in 1962, becoming a bencher in 1983, and became a Queen's Counsel in 1975. He co-edited Essays in Honour of Sir Brian Neill: the Quintessential Judge with Richard Susskind, former Gresham Professor of Law, and contributed to Civil Court Service 2007.

Judicial career
Saville was appointed a judge of the High Court in 1985 and, as is tradition, was knighted at this time. In 1994, he became a Lord Justice of Appeal, a judge of the Court of Appeal of England and Wales, and was appointed to the Privy Council, affording him the style, The Right Honourable. On 28 July 1997, he replaced Lord Mustill as a Lord of Appeal in Ordinary, receiving a life peerage as Baron Saville of Newdigate of Newdigate in the County of Surrey. He and nine other Lords of Appeal in Ordinary became Justices of the Supreme Court upon that body's inauguration on 1 October 2009. He sits as a crossbencher.

Between 1994 and 1996 Saville chaired a committee on arbitration law that led to the Arbitration Act 1996.

In 1997 Saville received an honorary LL.D. from London Guildhall University.

Since 2006 he has held the post of President of The Academy of Experts.

Bloody Sunday Inquiry

On 29 January 1998, Lord Saville of Newdigate was appointed to chair the second Bloody Sunday Inquiry, a public inquiry commissioned by Prime Minister Tony Blair into Bloody Sunday, an incident in 1972 in Derry, Northern Ireland, when 27 people were shot by members of the 1st Battalion of the Parachute Regiment, resulting in 14 deaths. The previous inquiry, the Widgery Tribunal, had been described by Irish nationalists as a whitewash. Other members of the panel were Sir Edward Somers, former judge of the Court of Appeal of New Zealand, and William Lloyd Hoyt, former Chief Justice of New Brunswick.

The report was published on 15 June 2010.
British Prime Minister David Cameron addressed the House of Commons that afternoon where he acknowledged that the paratroopers had fired the first shot, had fired on fleeing unarmed civilians, and shot and killed one man who was already wounded. He then apologised on behalf of the British Government. The inquiry came into controversy for attempts to force journalists Alex Thomson, Lena Ferguson and Toby Harnden to disclose their sources, for its 12-year duration and for its final cost of £195 million.

Personal life
Lord Saville of Newdigate married Jill Gray in 1961, with whom he has two sons (William Christian Saville and Henry Saville). He enjoys sailing, flying and computers, and is a member of the Garrick Club in London.

References

1936 births
Living people
Members of the Privy Council of the United Kingdom
Alumni of Brasenose College, Oxford
Law lords
20th-century English judges
Queen's Bench Division judges
Members of the Middle Temple
20th-century King's Counsel
Members of the Judicial Committee of the Privy Council
British King's Counsel
Judges of the Supreme Court of the United Kingdom
Royal Sussex Regiment officers
Crossbench life peers
Knights Bachelor
21st-century English judges